Degranvillea is a genus of flowering plants from the orchid family, Orchidaceae. At the present time, there is only one known species, Degranvillea dermaptera, endemic to French Guiana

See also 
 List of Orchidaceae genera

References 

Pridgeon, A.M., Cribb, P.J., Chase, M.C. & Rasmussen, F.N. (2003) Genera Orchidacearum 3: 192 ff. Oxford University Press.
Berg Pana, H. 2005. Handbuch der Orchideen-Namen. Dictionary of Orchid Names. Dizionario dei nomi delle orchidee. Ulmer, Stuttgart

External links 
 

Monotypic Orchidoideae genera
Cranichideae genera
Spiranthinae
Orchids of French Guiana